The Ed Evanko Show is a Canadian music variety television series which aired on CBC Television in 1967.

Premise
Ed Evanko, an actor and singer, was featured in this mid-season series. Bob McMullin headed the series house band and choir. Guests artists included Winnipeg-area artists such as Lenny Breau, Miriam Breitman, Hector Bremner, Peggy Neville, Ray St. Germain, Bobbi Sherron, Lorraine West and Yvette.

Scheduling
This half-hour series was broadcast on Saturdays at 7:00 p.m. (Eastern) from 24 June to 22 July 1967.

References

External links
 
 

CBC Television original programming
1967 Canadian television series debuts
1967 Canadian television series endings
1960s Canadian variety television series
Television shows filmed in Winnipeg